The Birch Memorial Clock Tower is a clock tower in Ipoh, Kinta District, Perak, Malaysia.

History
The clock tower was constructed to commemorate James W. W. Birch, the first British Resident of the state of Perak and unveiled in 1909 at a cost of $25,000.

Architecture 
The clock tower is located in a square with a portrait bust and four panels illustrative of the growth of civilization. It has a mother bell and four smaller bells which used to strike the chimes.

The growth of civilization 
There are four panels each one of the depicting the exponents of the different stages of civilization:

Panel A (North)

The stone age:

A Hunter, A Fisherman, A Woman spinning.

The iron age:

A man and a woman

The Early Eastern Peoples :

A Nubian with gold and ivory, A Chaldean Astrologer, A Woman making pottery, An Egyptian, An Assyrian, A Persian.

Panel B (West)

The Eastern Mediterranean:

Moses, David, A Phoenician, A woman representing the Agean civilization.

The Far East:

Confucius, Buddha, Lao Tzu.

Greece and Rome:

A woman representing Greek Art, Alexander the Great, Plato, Augustus.

Panel C (South)

The Byzantine Empire:

Constantine the Great.

Islam:

Mohammed.

The Age of Chivalry:

A Crusader.

The Age of Faith:

Saint Clare of Assisi

Gothic Art:

Saint Thomas Aquinas

The Renaissance:

Galileo Galilei, Michelangelo, Vittoria Colonna, Columbus.

The Reformation:

Martin Luther.

The Elizabethan Age:

William Shakespeare.

Panel D (East)

Modern Science, Art and Social Services:

Isaac Newton, William Harvey, James Watt, An unnamed Embroiderer, Beethoven, Robert Stephenson, Louis Daguerre, Florence Nightingale, Charles Darwin, Thomas Alva Edison, Joseph Lister.

See also
 List of tourist attractions in Perak

References

1909 establishments in British Malaya
Buildings and structures in Ipoh
Clock towers in Malaysia
Tourist attractions in Perak
Towers completed in 1909